Billy Falcon (born July 13, 1956) is an American musician, composer and music producer. He released rock albums throughout the late 1970s and 1980s, as well as appearing on The Way International's "High Country Caravan". He is currently active in the Nashville, Tennessee area with the band The Sowing Circle.

Career
He signed his first record contract with a major label at age 18. Falcon, a prolific writer, considers himself a "reporter" of his life experiences in lyrics and melodies.

Pretty Blue World, released in 1991, produced Falcon's highest-charting single, "Power Windows", which broke into the Top 40. The same album contains "Heaven’s Highest Hill", which articulates the pain of having to tell his three-year-old daughter that her mother had died, echoing the true-life event of the loss of his wife Myla to breast cancer.

He signed a deal with Mercury Records after Jon Bon Jovi contacted him about working together in the early 1990s. Falcon has co-written over thirty songs on several Bon Jovi albums. "Give in to Me", co-written with Falcon's daughter Rose and Elisha Hoffman, is featured in the Sony Pictures film Country Strong and performed by Faith Hill on the film's soundtrack. Other songs he has written have been covered by Stevie Nicks, Cher, Manfred Mann, Sherrie Austin, Meat Loaf and Trace Adkins. Over his career, Falcon has released more than a dozen albums.
 
Falcon has lived in Nashville for the past 19 years. Over the past four years, he has performed with the band The Sowing Circle and continues to write, perform, record and produce albums for artists, including his daughter.

Discography

Albums
1977  Billy Falcon's Burning Rose
1979  Billy Falcon (aka Improper Attire)
1979  Priceless EP (as Billy Falcon Group)
1980  Falcon Around
1983  School of Hard Knocks EP (as Billy & Myla)
1986  Spark in the Dark
1988  Haunted Guitar
1991  Pretty Blue World
1994  Letters From A Paper Ship
2003  Songs About Girls
2004  Released (recorded in 1995)
2006  Made Man
2011  WHEN
2018  Holy Fire
Singles

Songwriting credits

Stevie Nicks
Timespace: The Best of Stevie Nicks (1991)
"Sometimes It's a Bitch" [Jon Bon Jovi, Billy Falcon]

Bon Jovi
Crush (2000)
"Just Older" [Jon Bon Jovi, Billy Falcon]
"Mystery Train" [Jon Bon Jovi, Billy Falcon]
"Say It Isn't So" [Bon Jovi, Billy Falcon]
"I Could Make a Living Out of Lovin' You" [Jon Bon Jovi, Richie Sambora, Billy Falcon]
Bounce (2002)
"Bounce" [Jon Bon Jovi, Richie Sambora, Billy Falcon]
"Undivided [Jon Bon Jovi, Richie Sambora, Billy Falcon]
100,000,000 Bon Jovi Fans Can't Be Wrong (2004)
"These Arms Are Open All Night" [Jon Bon Jovi, Billy Falcon]
"Kidnap an Angel" [Jon Bon Jovi, Billy Falcon]
"Another Reason to Believe" [Jon Bon Jovi, Richie Sambora, Billy Falcon, J. Steele]
"Last Man Standing" [Jon Bon Jovi, Billy Falcon]
Have a Nice Day (2005)
"Last Man Standing" [Jon Bon Jovi, Billy Falcon]
"Story of My Life" [Jon Bon Jovi, Billy Falcon]
"Complicated" [Jon Bon Jovi,  Billy Falcon, Max Martin]
Lost Highway (2007)
"Everybody's Broken [Jon Bon Jovi, Billy Falcon]
"I Love This Town" [Jon Bon Jovi, Richie Sambora; Billy Falcon]
The Circle (2009)
"When We Were Beautiful" [Billy Falcon Jon Bon Jovi, Richie Sambora]
"Superman Tonight" [Billy Falcon, Jon Bon Jovi]
"Love's the Only Rule" [Billy Falcon, Jon Bon Jovi]
What About Now (2013)
"Because We Can" [Billy Falcon, Jon Bon Jovi, Richie Sambora]
"Amen" [Billy Falcon, Jon Bon Jovi]
"That's What the Water Made Me" [Billy Falcon, Jon Bon Jovi]
"What's Left of Me" [Billy Falcon, Jon Bon Jovi, Richie Sambora]
"Beautiful  World" [Billy Falcon, Jon Bon Jovi]
"With These Two Hands" [Billy Falcon, Jon Bon Jovi]
"Into the Echo" [Billy Falcon, Jon Bon Jovi]
Burning Bridges (2015)
"A Teardrop to the Sea" [Jon Bon Jovi, Billy Falcon]
"Who Would You Die For" [Jon Bon Jovi, Billy Falcon]
"Fingerprints" [Jon Bon Jovi, Billy Falcon]
"Life Is Beautiful" [Jon Bon Jovi, Billy Falcon]
This House Is Not for Sale (2016)
"This House Is Not for Sale" [Jon Bon Jovi, John Shanks, Billy Falcon]
"Labor of Love" [Jon Bon Jovi, John Shanks, Billy Falcon]
"Born Again Tomorrow" [Jon Bon Jovi, John Shanks, Billy Falcon]
"New Year's Day" [Jon Bon Jovi, Billy Falcon]
"The Devil's in the Temple" [Jon Bon Jovi, Billy Falcon]
"Scars on This Guitar" [Jon Bon Jovi, Brett James, Billy Falcon]
"Real Love" [Jon Bon Jovi, Billy Falcon]
"I Will Drive You Home" [Jon Bon Jovi, Billy Falcon, Luke Laird]
"Touch of Grey" [Jon Bon Jovi, Brett James, Billy Falcon]
"Color Me In" [Jon Bon Jovi, Billy Falcon]

Bon Jovi 2020
 Shine [Jon Bon Jovi, John Shanks, Billy Falcon]
 Limitless [Jon Bon Jovi, John Shanks, Billy Falcon]
 Luv Can [Jon Bon Jovi, Billy Falcon]
 Beautiful Drug [Jon Bon Jovi, John Shanks, Billy Falcon]

Faith Hill
Country Strong: Original Motion Picture Soundtrack (2010)
"Give in to Me" [Billy & Rose Falcon, Elisha Hoffman]

Meat Loaf
Hang Cool Teddy Bear (2010)
"Elvis in Vegas" [Billy Falcon, Desmond Child, Jon Bon Jovi]

See also
 Rose Falcon

References

External links
 Official Site

1956 births
Living people
American rock singers
American rock songwriters
American male singer-songwriters
Mercury Records artists
Singer-songwriters from New York (state)